Gift Tandare (died 2007) was a member of the Zimbabwe political party Movement for Democratic Change. He was shot dead by police at a prayer meeting. The government of Zimbabwe denied the family permission to bury him at Granville cemetery in Harare, fearing reprisals from mourners. He was buried at his rural home.

External links
 BBC news

Year of birth missing
2007 deaths
Zimbabwean politicians
People shot dead by law enforcement officers